Johan Støa (13 June 1900 – 29 October 1991) was a Norwegian multi-sportsman. He competed as athlete (marathon runner), cross-country skier, ski jumper, cyclist, swimmer, footballer, and boxer.

He was born in Råstad and died in Drammen.

In February 1928 he finished eighth in the 50 kilometre cross-country skiing event at the Winter Olympics at St. Moritz.

Then in August 1928 he finished 36th in the Olympic marathon at the Summer Olympics at Amsterdam.

Cross-country skiing results

Olympic Games

External links
 sports-reference profile
 Profile 

1900 births
1991 deaths
Norwegian male cross-country skiers
Norwegian male long-distance runners
Olympic cross-country skiers of Norway
Olympic athletes of Norway
Cross-country skiers at the 1928 Winter Olympics
Athletes (track and field) at the 1928 Summer Olympics
People from Sandefjord
Sportspeople from Vestfold og Telemark